Radio is a 2003 American semi-biographical sports drama film directed by Mike Tollin, and inspired by the 1996 Sports Illustrated article "Someone to Lean On" by Gary Smith. The article and the movie are based on the true story of T. L. Hanna High School football coach Harold Jones (Ed Harris) and a young man with an intellectual disability, James Robert "Radio" Kennedy (Cuba Gooding Jr.). The film co-stars Debra Winger and Alfre Woodard. It was filmed primarily in Walterboro, South Carolina because its buildings and downtown core still fit the look of the era the film was trying to depict.

Plot
In the 1970s, James Robert "Radio" Kennedy, a 23-year-old mentally disabled man, lives alone with his mother who, as a nurse, spends much of the day at work. Radio spends much of his day roaming the town and pushing a shopping cart, which he uses to collect anything interesting he finds. Radio often pauses to observe the local high school football team in their training sessions, led by Coach Harold Jones. During one such session, the football falls out of bounds, allowing Radio to collect it and haul it away in his cart. A group of players retaliate the following day by tying Radio's hands and feet, locking him in the gear shed, and throwing footballs at the door to scare him. Coach Jones frees Radio and punishes the wrongdoers by making them run extra wind sprints after practice. Jones takes it upon himself to assist in Radio's care, and gives him his nickname due to his penchant for listening to the radio. Radio begins assisting Coach Jones on the football team, and inspires the team before each game as a mascot-type figure. Radio's increased attention from Jones is faced with resistance from the football team's parents, who see Radio as a distraction from their own sons' successes.

Upon the end of the football season, Jones involves Radio with several activities within the high school, and winds up neglecting his daughter Mary Helen, who is a member of the high school's cheerleading squad. At a Christmas mass, Radio receives several gifts from the townspeople, and Mary Helen confides to her father that while she does not blame him for neglecting her, she cannot understand the reason for his interest in Radio. The following day, Radio distributes the gifts around town. He soon encounters a suspicious police officer, and his impaired ability to communicate leads to his arrest on the charge of possessing stolen property. However, the other officers recognize Radio and he is released.  To make up for the wrongful arrest, the arresting officer is forced to ferry Radio around town to finish delivering the gifts. Following the holidays, Radio begins taking classes in the high school to complete his formal education. One of the football players who had previously tormented him tricks Radio into entering the girls' locker room. Radio is reluctant to tell Coach Jones who set him up, but Coach Jones determines the player's identity by interviewing other players and punishes him by benching him for a decisive game. 
Radio's mother suddenly dies of a heart attack, and Radio finds himself living alone until his absent older brother Walter finally returns to care for him. That same evening, Jones reveals to Mary Helen that his attachment to Radio and need to assist him stems from a childhood incident in which Jones, as a child making a living off delivering newspapers, did not help a mentally disabled boy his own age crying behind barbed wire. Following the death of Radio's mother, pressure from the school board to have Radio put in a specialized institution strengthens. The association between Radio and Coach Jones is further blamed for the team's inability to win. In a meeting with the townspeople, Jones speaks of Radio being a blessing for the community by showing how people should treat one another, and announces his resignation as head coach so that he may spend more time with his family. At Radio's high school graduation, he receives an honorary diploma and a letterman jacket.  The film ends with clips being shown of the real-life Radio and Coach Jones leading the football team.

Cast
Cuba Gooding Jr. as James Robert "Radio" Kennedy
Ed Harris as Coach Harold Jones, the head football coach
Debra Winger as Mrs. Linda Jones
S. Epatha Merkerson as Maggie Kennedy, Radio's mother
Sarah Drew as Mary Helen Jones
Alfre Woodard as Principal Daniels
Brent Sexton as Coach Honeycutt, assistant football coach and head basketball coach
Riley Smith as Johnny Clay
Chris Mulkey as Frank Clay, Johnny's father
Patrick Breen as Tucker

Background

The film's lead character, Radio, is based on James Robert "Radio" Kennedy, who was born October 14, 1946 in Anderson, South Carolina. His nickname, Radio, was given to him by townspeople because Kennedy grew up fascinated by radios and because of the radio he carried everywhere he went. He was known to ask students before football games, "We gonna get that quarterback?", and say "We gonna win tonight!". ReelSports provided the football and basketball coordination for the film.

Reception
On review aggregate Rotten Tomatoes, the film holds a 36% approval rating with the consensus reading: "The story is heavy on syrupy uplift and turns Radio into a saint/cuddly pet". The film holds a score of 38 out of 100 on Metacritic.  The film grossed $52.3 million with a budget of approximately $30 million. Cuba Gooding Jr. earned a Golden Raspberry Award nomination for Worst Actor for his performance in the film but also an NAACP Image Award for Best Actor in a Motion Picture.

Awards and nominations

Soundtrack
The soundtrack to Radio was released on October 21, 2003.

See also

List of teachers portrayed in films
White savior narrative in film

References

External links
 
  The magazine article that inspired Mike Tollin to make the film.
 
  Answers some questions about the factual accuracy of the movie.
 
 

2003 films
2003 drama films
2003 biographical drama films
2000s high school films
2000s sports drama films
African-American biographical dramas
American sports drama films
Anderson County, South Carolina
Biographical films about educators
Biographical films about sportspeople
Films about intellectual disability
Films based on newspaper and magazine articles
Films set in the 1970s
Films set in 1976
Films shot in South Carolina
High school football films
Columbia Pictures films
Cultural depictions of players of American football
Films directed by Michael Tollin
Films scored by James Horner
Films set in South Carolina
Revolution Studios films
Sports films based on actual events
2000s English-language films
2000s American films